Lim Lean Teng was a successful businessman who established schools in Penang with his wealth. He was born in 1870 in China. He first migrated to Penang, then to British Malaya.

Career
Lim Lean Teng ventured into business in Penang. He was successful and became a millionaire. He was one of the richest people in Penang at that time. He owned a bungalow as a personal residence. He also owned several other properties around the island. He helped establish the Han Chiang School with the Teochew Association of Penang. In 1919, the Teochew Association tried to established SJK(C) Han Chiang but was short of funds. Lim Lean Teng came forward and donated the needed funds. The school was established on Chulia Street in Penang.
 
In 1950, Mr. Lim also established Han Chiang High School. This school was also on Chulia Street. However, by the time Han Chiang High School was founded, the school was overcrowded. Lim Lean Teng donated a piece of property piece to construct a new school. He gave  of land in Jalan Datuk Keramat, George Town for the school's construction purposes. Lim Lean Teng continued to support the two Han Chiang schools.

In 1963, Lim Lean Teng died at age 93. Han Chiang School mourned the loss of their founder. Many people paid their respects and remembered his philanthropy for Chinese education in Malaysia.

Recognitions and honours
In 1958, Lim Lean Teng was honoured with a bronze statue established in front of Han Chiang High School. It was unveiled by the 1st Prime Minister of the then Federation of Malaya, Tunku Abdul Rahman. After his death, Jalan Lim Lean Teng (aka Lim Lean Teng Road) was dedicated in memory of his works. The named road is the location of the Han Chiang High School.

Honour of Malaya
  : Companion of the Order of the Defender of the Realm (J.M.N.) (1958)

References 

1860 births
1963 deaths
Chinese emigrants to Malaysia
Malaysian people of Chinese descent
Malaysian philanthropists
School founders
Companions of the Order of the Defender of the Realm
Naturalised citizens of Malaysia